RNDr. Rudolf Bauer (born on September 28, 1957 in Ostrava, Czechoslovakia) was the first President of the Košice Self-governing Region (since December 19, 2001 till January 8, 2006).

He is also a former mathematician, the Mayor of the town of Košice and a deputy of the National Council of the Slovak Republic. As a member of Christian Democratic Movement he is a deputy of the Council of the Košice Self-governing Region. He is married with three children.

References 

1957 births
Living people
Politicians from Ostrava
Christian Democratic Movement politicians
Conservative Democrats of Slovakia politicians
Košice
Mayors of places in Slovakia
Slovak mathematicians
Members of the National Council (Slovakia) 1998-2002
Members of the National Council (Slovakia) 2006-2010